Operation Romeo was a French World War II commando operation.

It may also refer to:
 Operation Romeo (Nepal), a Nepalese operation in 1995
 Operation Romeo-Sierra, a Spanish operation in 2002
 Operation Romeo (film), a 2022 film